Miss World Puerto Rico 2013, was the 40th edition of the Miss World Puerto Rico pageant. It was held in the Guaynabo School of Fine Arts Theatre in Guaynabo, Puerto Rico on April 24, 2013. Nadyalee Torres of Caguas, was crowned Miss World Puerto Rico 2013 by outgoing titleholder Janelee Marcus Chaparro Colón of Barceloneta. Nadyalee Torres López represented Puerto Rico at Miss World 2013 which was held at Bali Nusa Dua Convention Center in South Kuta, Bali, Indonesia on September 28, 2013.

Results

Placements

Special Awards

Contestants 
Official 21 candidates of Miss World Puerto Rico 2013:
 Barceloneta - Nerlene Rosado
 Bayamón - Carol Rigual
 Caguas - Nadyalee Torres López
 Canóvanas - Leishla Díaz
 Carolina - Cristina Olivieri
 Cidra - Gabriela Rodríguez
 Coamo - Hilda Rivera
 Corozal - Nathaly F. Ferreira Garcia
 Fajardo - Marie Santana
 Guaynabo - Giannilys Bergollo
 Hatillo - Joselyne Arce
 Lajas - Lualmarie Serrano
 Mayagüez - Nicole Nazario
 Peñuelas - Layla N. Velázquez Rivera
 Río Grande - Génesis Concepción
 San Juan - Kiara Morales
 Santa Isabel - Merelyn Soto
 Toa Alta - Naneishka Marrero Nieves
 Toa Baja - Franceska Toro
 Trujillo Alto - Karimar Quiñones Algarín
 - Yauco - Luisa Raquel Sotero

References

External links 

 

2013 in Puerto Rico
2013
2013 beauty pageants
Miss Puerto Rico